The following outline is provided as an overview of and topical guide to Bhutan:

Bhutan – landlocked sovereign country located in South Asia.  Bhutan is located amidst the eastern end of the Himalaya Mountains and is bordered to the south, east and west by India and to the north by China. Bhutan is separated from Nepal by the Indian state of Sikkim. The Bhutanese call their country Druk Yul (land of the thunder dragon).

Foreign influences and tourism in Bhutan are regulated by the government to preserve the nation's traditional culture, identity and the environment. in 2006 Business Week rated Bhutan the happiest country in Asia and the eighth happiest country in the world. The landscape ranges from subtropical plains in the south to the Himalayan heights in the north, with some peaks exceeding 7,000 metres (23,000 ft). The state religion is Vajrayana Buddhism, and the population is predominantly Buddhist, with Hinduism being the second-largest religion. The capital and largest city is Thimphu. After centuries of direct monarchic rule, Bhutan held its first democratic elections in March 2008. Bhutan is a member of the South Asian Association for Regional Cooperation (SAARC).

General reference

 Pronunciation: 
 Common English country name: Bhutan
 Official English country name: The Kingdom of Bhutan
 Common endonym(s): Druk Yul  
 Official endonym(s): Druk Gyal Khap  
 Adjectival(s): Druk, Bhutanese
 Demonym(s): Bhutanese
 Etymology: Name of Bhutan
 International rankings of Bhutan
 ISO country codes: BT, BTN, 064
 ISO region codes: See ISO 3166-2:BT
 Internet country code top-level domain: .bt

Geography of Bhutan 

Geography of Bhutan
 Bhutan is: a landlocked country
 Location:
 Northern Hemisphere and Eastern Hemisphere
 Eurasia
 Asia
 South Asia
 Indian subcontinent
 Time zone:  Bhutan Time (UTC+06)
 Extreme points of Bhutan
 High:  Gangkhar Puensum 
 Low:  Drangme Chhu 
 Land boundaries:  1,075 km
 605 km
 470 km
 Coastline:  none
 Population of Bhutan: 672,425(2005)
 Area of Bhutan:  - 131st largest country
 Atlas of Bhutan

Environment of Bhutan 

Environment of Bhutan
 Climate of Bhutan
 Environmental issues in Bhutan
 Ecoregions in Bhutan
 Renewable energy in Bhutan
 Protected areas of Bhutan
 Wildlife of Bhutan
 Fauna of Bhutan
 Birds of Bhutan
 Mammals of Bhutan

Natural geographic features of Bhutan 

 Glaciers of Bhutan
 Lakes of Bhutan
 Mountains of Bhutan
 Rivers of Bhutan
 Valleys of Bhutan
 World Heritage Sites in Bhutan: None

Regions of Bhutan

Ecoregions of Bhutan 

List of ecoregions in Bhutan

Administrative divisions of Bhutan 

Administrative divisions of Bhutan
 Dzongkhags (districts) of Bhutan
 Dungkhags (sub-districts) of Bhutan
 Gewogs (village blocks) of Bhutan
 Thromdes (municipalities) of Bhutan
 Chiwogs (electoral constituencies) of Bhutan
 Villages of Bhutan

Districts of Bhutan 

Districts of Bhutan

Gewogs (village blocks) of Bhutan

Gewogs of Bhutan

Municipalities of Bhutan 

Thromde
 Capital of Bhutan: Thimphu
 Cities of Bhutan
 Cities, towns, and villages of Bhutan

Demography of Bhutan 

Demographics of Bhutan

Government and politics of Bhutan 

Politics of Bhutan
 Form of government: constitutional monarchy
 Capital of Bhutan: Thimphu
 Elections
 National Council, 2007–08
 General election, 2008
 Local elections, 2011 (2008)
 Political parties in Bhutan
 Taxation in Bhutan

Branches of government

Government of Bhutan

Executive branch of the government of Bhutan 
 Head of state: Druk Gyalpo
 Head of government: Prime Minister of Bhutan
 Cabinet (government): Lhengye Zhungtshog

Ministry of Agriculture
Ministry of Economic Affairs
Ministry of Education
Ministry of Finance
Ministry of Foreign Affairs
Ministry of Health
Ministry of Home and Cultural Affairs
Ministry Information and Communications
Ministry Labour and Human Resources
Ministry Works and Human Settlement

Legislative branch of the government of Bhutan 

 Parliament of Bhutan (bicameral)
 Upper house: National Council of Bhutan
 Lower house: National Assembly of Bhutan

Judicial branch of the government of Bhutan 

Judicial system of Bhutan
 Royal Court of Justice
 Supreme Court of Bhutan
 High Court of Bhutan
 Dzongkhag Court
 Dungkhag Court

Foreign relations of Bhutan 

Foreign relations of Bhutan
 Diplomatic missions in Bhutan
 Diplomatic missions of Bhutan

Bhutanese refugees 
Bhutanese refugees
Beldangi refugee camps
Goldhap refugee camp
Khudunabari refugee camp
Sanischare refugee camp
Timai refugee camp

International organization membership 
The Kingdom of Bhutan is a member of:

Asian Development Bank (ADB)
Bay of Bengal Initiative for Multi-Sectoral Technical and Economic Cooperation (BIMSTEC)
Colombo Plan (CP)
Food and Agriculture Organization (FAO)
Group of 77 (G77)
International Bank for Reconstruction and Development (IBRD)
International Civil Aviation Organization (ICAO)
International Criminal Police Organization (Interpol)
International Development Association (IDA)
International Finance Corporation (IFC)
International Fund for Agricultural Development (IFAD)
International Monetary Fund (IMF)
International Olympic Committee (IOC)
International Organization for Migration (IOM) (observer)
International Organization for Standardization (ISO) (correspondent)
International Telecommunication Union (ITU)
International Telecommunications Satellite Organization (ITSO)

Nonaligned Movement (NAM)
Organisation for the Prohibition of Chemical Weapons (OPCW)
South Asia Co-operative Environment Programme (SACEP)
South Asian Association for Regional Cooperation (SAARC)
United Nations (UN)
United Nations Conference on Trade and Development (UNCTAD)
United Nations Educational, Scientific, and Cultural Organization (UNESCO)
United Nations Industrial Development Organization (UNIDO)
Universal Postal Union (UPU)
World Customs Organization (WCO)
World Federation of Trade Unions (WFTU)
World Health Organization (WHO)
World Intellectual Property Organization (WIPO)
World Meteorological Organization (WMO)
World Tourism Organization (UNWTO)
World Trade Organization (WTO) (observer)

Law and order in Bhutan 

Law of Bhutan
 Bhutanese legislation
 Constitution of Bhutan
 Bhutanese Citizenship Act 1958
 Bhutanese Citizenship Act 1985
 Local Government Act of Bhutan 2009
 Tobacco Control Act of Bhutan 2010
 Human rights in Bhutan
 Capital punishment in Bhutan
 Freedom of religion in Bhutan
 LGBT rights in Bhutan
 Law enforcement in Bhutan
Royal Bhutan Police
 Crime in Bhutan
 Tsa Yig (historical legal code)

Military of Bhutan 

Military of Bhutan
 Command
 Commander-in-chief: King of Bhutan
 Forces
 Army of Bhutan
 Navy of Bhutan: None
 Air Force of Bhutan
 Military history of Bhutan

Local government in Bhutan

History of Bhutan 

History of Bhutan
Timeline of the history of Bhutan

Historical events
 Bhutan War (Duar War)
 Slavery in Bhutan
 Treaty of Punakha

Historical families and figures
 Dorji family
Ugyen Dorji
 Jigme Palden Dorji
 House of Wangchuck
 Jigme Namgyal
 Ugyen Wangchuck

Historical government
Dzongpen
Provinces of Bhutan

Bumthang Province
Daga Province
Kurmaed Province
Kurtoed Province
Paro Province
Punakha Province
Thimphu Province
Trongsa Province
Wangdue Phodrang Province

Penlop
Penlop of Trongsa

Ancient Kingdoms
Bumthang Kingdom

Culture of Bhutan 

Culture of Bhutan
 Architecture of Bhutan
 Cuisine of Bhutan
 Ethnic groups in Bhutan
 Media in Bhutan
 National symbols of Bhutan
 Coat of arms of Bhutan
 Flag of Bhutan
 National anthem of Bhutan
 Prostitution in Bhutan
 Public holidays in Bhutan
 Tsechus
 Religion in Bhutan
 Buddhism in Bhutan
 Christianity in Bhutan
 Hinduism in Bhutan
 Islam in Bhutan
 World Heritage Sites in Bhutan: None

Art in Bhutan 
 Art in Bhutan
 Cinema of Bhutan
 Music of Bhutan
 Television in Bhutan

Languages in Bhutan

Languages of Bhutan

Tibeto-Burman languages
Bodish languages
Tibetan languages (South Bodish, Central Bodish, West Bodish)
Dzongkha
Brokkat language
Brokpa language
Chocangacakha
Khams Tibetan language
Lakha
East Bodish languages
Bumthang language
Chali language
Dakpa language
Dzala language
Kheng language
Kurtöp language (Zhâke / Kurtoep-kha)
'Olekha (Mönpa)
Nyenkha
Gongduk
Gurung
Kiranti (including Camling and Limbu)
Lepcha
Lhokpu
Nepal Bhasa
Tamang
Tshangla language(Sharchop-kha)
Indo-Aryan languages
Nepali language

Sports in Bhutan 

Sports in Bhutan
 Football in Bhutan
Bhutan national football team
 Cricket in Bhutan
 Bhutan national cricket team
 Bhutan at the Olympics

Economy and infrastructure of Bhutan

Economy of Bhutan
 Economic rank, by nominal GDP (2007): 162nd (one hundred and sixty second)
 Agriculture in Bhutan
 Banking in Bhutan
 Royal Monetary Authority of Bhutan (central bank)
 Currency of Bhutan: Ngultrum
 ISO 4217: BTN
 Communications in Bhutan
 Internet in Bhutan
 Companies of Bhutan
 Energy in Bhutan
 Health care in Bhutan
 Mining in Bhutan
 Royal Securities Exchange of Bhutan
 Tourism in Bhutan
 Transport in Bhutan
 Airports in Bhutan
 Rail transport in Bhutan
 Roads in Bhutan
 Lateral Road

Education in Bhutan 

Education in Bhutan

Health in Bhutan 

Health in Bhutan

See also 

Bhutan

Index of Bhutan-related articles
List of Bhutan-related topics
List of international rankings
Member state of the United Nations
Outline of Asia
Outline of geography

Sources

References

External links

Bhutan Links Page - at the National Library of Bhutan.

Government of Bhutan portal
Tourism Council of Bhutan (Official)

Bhutan